Rumours was a Canadian television sitcom, that aired on CBC Television in 2006 and 2007. The show centred on Ben and Sarah, co-editors of a women's magazine in Toronto.

Based on the successful Quebec sitcom Rumeurs, the show was produced by Moses Znaimer and written by Isabelle Langlois. Twenty episodes were made, of which nine aired in 2006 before the show was cancelled due to low ratings. The last 11 episodes aired in the summer of 2007.

Cast
David Haydn-Jones as Ben Devlin
Amy Price-Francis as Sarah Barnaby
Sadie Leblanc
Jennifer Dale
Stephanie Anne Mills
Lucinda Davis

Episode list
One of Those Days
First Impressions
A Good Man Is Hard to Find
Rivalries
Close Up
The Real Thing
25 Ways to Drive Him Wild
Moments to Cherish
Dizzy Spells
The Shadow of Doubt
Telling Details
The Slightest Imperfection
Bumps in the Night
Erroneous Zone
Unforgettable
The Moment of Truth
Look Before You Leap
Chaos? What Chaos?
My Life Is a Soap Opera Pt 1
My Life Is a Soap Opera Pt 2

References

External links

 
 CBC Rumours website

CBC Television original programming
2006 Canadian television series debuts
2007 Canadian television series endings
Television shows set in Toronto
2000s Canadian sitcoms
2000s Canadian workplace comedy television series